California Noir - Chapter One: Analog Beaches & Digital Cities is the third studio album by American electronic rock band Julien-K. It is the first album without former drummer Elias Andra. During the recording process he was replaced by Eli James who he also replaced in Dead By Sunrise, the alternative rock side project of Linkin Park frontman Chester Bennington. Furthermore, this album is the first chapter of the concept album California Noir. The second chapter, Nightlife in Neon, was released on August 5, 2016.

Background 
The album was first announced in January 2015 via Facebook. This announcement came along with an Indiegogo campaign in order to finance the album. It started on January 26, 2015, and aimed for a goal of $10,000; however, when the campaign ended 30 days later more than $28,000 had been collected. The initial goal of $10,000 was reached within 10 hours.

Track listing

Personnel 
Julien-K
 Ryan Shuck – lead vocals, rhythm guitar
 Amir Derakh – lead guitar, bass guitar, synthesizer, percussion
 Anthony 'Fu' Valcic – programming, samples, bass guitar

Additional musicians
 Eric Stoffel – programming, synthesizer on tracks 2, 4
 Craig 'Craigypants' Williams – programming, synthesizer on track 8
 Caitlyn Youngblood – background vocals on track 2
 Len Hotrum – background vocals on track 7
 Amber Snead – female choir on track 10
 Eli James – drums, percussion on tracks 4, 5, 6, 7
 Frank Zummo – drums, percussion on track 4
 Ricardo Restrepo – drums, percussion on track 4 
 Elias Malin – drums, percussion on track 9

References 

Julien-K albums
2015 albums